In statistics, the Bhattacharyya distance measures the similarity of two probability distributions. It is closely related to the Bhattacharyya coefficient which is a measure of the amount of overlap between two statistical samples or populations.

It is not a metric, despite named a "distance", since it does not obey the triangle inequality.

Definition 

where

is the Bhattacharyya coefficient for discrete probability distributions.

.

Such a measure, even such a probability measure, always exists, e.g. .

,
We then have
.
We finally define the Bhattacharyya coefficient
. 

Properties 

 does not obey the triangle inequality, though the Hellinger distance  does.

And in general, given two multivariate normal distributions ,
 

where  Note that the first term is a squared Mahalanobis distance.

Applications 
The Bhattacharyya coefficient quantifies the "closeness" of two random statistical samples.

The quality of estimation depends on the choice of buckets; too few buckets would overestimate , while too many would underestimate..

A common task in classification is estimating the separability of classes. Up to a multiplicative factor, the squared Mahalanobis distance is a special case of the Bhattacharyya distance when the two classes are normally distributed with the same variances. When two classes have similar means but significantly different variances, the Mahalanobis distance would be close to zero, while the Bhattacharyya distance would not be.

The Bhattacharyya coefficient is used in the construction of polar codes.

The Bhattacharyya distance is used in feature extraction and selection, image processing, speaker recognition, and phone clustering.

A "Bhattacharyya space" has been proposed as a feature selection technique that can be applied to texture segmentation.

History 
Both the Bhattacharyya distance and the Bhattacharyya coefficient are named after Anil Kumar Bhattacharyya, a statistician who worked in the 1930s at the Indian Statistical Institute. He developed the method to measure the distance between two non-normal distributions and illustrated this with the classical multinomial populations as well as probability distributions that are absolutely continuous with respect to the Lebesgue measure. The latter work appeared partly in 1943 in the Bulletin of the Calcutta Mathematical Society, while the former part, despite being submitted for publication in 1941, appeared almost five years later in Sankhya.

See also 

 Bhattacharyya angle
 Kullback–Leibler divergence
 Hellinger distance
 Mahalanobis distance
 Chernoff bound
 Rényi entropy
 F-divergence
 Fidelity of quantum states

References 

 

 

 

 For a short list of properties, see: http://www.mtm.ufsc.br/~taneja/book/node20.html

External links
 
 Bhattacharyya's distance measure as a precursor of genetic distance measures, Journal of Biosciences, 2004
 Statistical Intuition of Bhattacharyya's distance

Statistical distance
Statistical deviation and dispersion
Anil Kumar Bhattacharya